Karl Boès (1866–1914) was a French magazine editor, notable as the second editor of La Plume.

1866 births
1914 deaths
French publishers (people)
French magazine editors
French male non-fiction writers